Novi Pazar Municipality is a municipality (obshtina) in Shumen Province, Northeastern Bulgaria, located between Ludogorie and Provadia Plateau, not far from South Dobrudzha geographical region. It is named after its administrative centre - the town of Novi Pazar.

The southernmost part of the area is crossed by the eastern operating section of Hemus motorway which is planned to connect the port of Varna with the country capital – Sofia.

Settlements 

Novi Pazar Municipality includes the following 16 places (towns are shown in bold):

Demography 
The following table shows the change of the population during the last four decades.

Ethnic composition
According to the 2011 census, among those who answered the optional question on ethnic identification, the ethnic composition of the municipality was the following:

See also
Provinces of Bulgaria
Municipalities of Bulgaria
List of cities and towns in Bulgaria

References

External links
 Official website 

Municipalities in Shumen Province